Wakely is a surname. Notable people with the surname include:

Alex Wakely (born 1988), English cricketer
Ernie Wakely (born 1940), Canadian ice hockey player
Jimmy Wakely (1914–1982), American actor, songwriter, and singer

See also
Wakeley (name)